Geological Journal is a peer-reviewed academic journal focusing on Geology.

References 

Geology journals